Eloy Ruiz Pinto (born 7 January 1989 in Mollina) is a former Spanish racing cyclist.

References

1989 births
Living people
Spanish male cyclists
Sportspeople from the Province of Málaga
Cyclists from Andalusia